The Romantic Age is a 1949 British drama film directed by Edmond T. Gréville. The screenplay by Peggy Barwell and Edward Dryhurst is based on the French novel Lycee des jeunes filles by Serge Véber. The film was retitled Naughty Arlette for the American release.

Plot
The plot focuses on middle-aged Arnold Dickson, an art master who joins the staff of the girls' school in which his daughter Julie is enrolled. He soon finds himself the target of Arlette, a sophisticated French exchange student who has more than education on her mind. On a dare, she seduces the professor into running off to Paris with her, a plot derailed by Julie when she orchestrates a scheme designed to help him put the affair into perspective.

Production notes
In 1960, composer Charles Williams topped the American pop music charts with his theme for the film The Apartment. It originally had been written for and was heard in this film under the title "Jealous Lover".

Principal cast
Hugh Williams ..... Arnold Dickson
Mai Zetterling ..... Arlette 
Petula Clark ..... Julie Dickson 
Margot Grahame ..... Helen Dickson
Carol Marsh ..... Patricia 
Raymond Lovell ..... Hedge 
Paul Dupuis ..... Henri Sinclair
Margaret Barton  .....  Bessie  
Marie Ney .....  Miss Hallam  
Mark Daly .....  Withers

Critical reception
Picturegoer called the film a "flimsy, but in parts not unamusing trifle" that is "very theatrical" and added, "Mai Zetterling has an unsuitable role for her as a French girl and Hugh Williams is suitably stodgy as the master. His wife is well characterised by Margot Grahame and Petula Clark is charming and ingenuous as his daughter."

Today's Cimema described it as a "rather dull story" that "lacks the sparkle and fun that would have widened its appeal . . . Mai Zetterling is too mature for the role of Arlette, for her mannerisms become irritating and her attitude quite absurd. Petula Clark is much more successful as the master's charming daughter Julie, for she has been given a role suited to her age and experience . . . The Romantic Age should amuse adolescents who may be more able to appreciate its point but it is unlikely to be equally entertaining to adults."

TV Guide rates the film two out of a possible four stars and comments, "It's not a particularly tasteful theme, nor is the comedy handled with the wit necessary to pull it off. The results are fairly pedestrian and lack any real style".

References

External links
 The Romantic Age at the Internet Movie Database

1949 films
1949 drama films
British drama films
British black-and-white films
Compositions by Charles Williams
Films based on French novels
Films about scandalous teacher–student relationships
Films set in schools
Films directed by Edmond T. Gréville
1940s English-language films
1940s British films